Sergio Sestelo Guijarro (born 19 August 1978, in Madrid) is a Spanish retired footballer who played as a forward.

He is best remembered as the catalyst for Los Coladeros remarkable rise through the Spanish League system, eventually qualifying for the Champions League.

References

External links

1978 births
Living people
Footballers from Madrid
Spanish footballers
Association football forwards
La Liga players
Segunda División players
Segunda División B players
Tercera División players
Real Madrid Castilla footballers
CD Numancia players
AD Ceuta footballers
SD Huesca footballers
Villajoyosa CF footballers
UD San Sebastián de los Reyes players
CD Linares players
UD Socuéllamos players
SD Compostela footballers